Ban Chan may refer to:
Ban Chan, Chiang Mai, a subdistrict (tambon) in Galyani Vadhana District, Chiang Mai, Thailand
Ban Chan Subdistrict in Ban Dung District, Udon Thani, Thailand

See also
Banchan, side dishes served along with cooked rice in Korean cuisine